Perry High School is a public high school located in Perry, Ohio.  It is the only high school in the Perry Local School District.  The school's athletic teams are nicknamed the Pirates and they compete in the Western Reserve Conference.

References

Alumni
Luke Farrell (class of 2016) - NFL player
Nick Walker (class OF 2012) - Country Music Artist
Brandon Staley (class of 2001) - NFL Head Coach

External links
 District Website

High schools in Lake County, Ohio
Public high schools in Ohio